Aarne Roine (10 November 1893 – 13 May 1938) was a Finnish gymnast. He competed in nine events at the 1924 Summer Olympics.

References

External links
 

1893 births
1938 deaths
Finnish male artistic gymnasts
Olympic gymnasts of Finland
Gymnasts at the 1924 Summer Olympics
People from Salo, Finland
Sportspeople from Southwest Finland